Tetiana Leonidivna Andriienko (27 December 1938 – 27 December 2016) was a Ukrainian botanist, conservationist, and professor. She was known for her scientific research on the distribution of vegetation in Polesia, which in turn helped create protected wildlife areas. Andriienko was the head of the Interdepartmental Complex Laboratory of Scientific Fundamentals of Protected Areas of the National Academy of Sciences of Ukraine and the Ministry of Environmental Protection and Natural Resources Ukraine. 

She was a laureate of the State Prize of Ukraine in Science and Technology (2005), was awarded the Order of Princess Olga and the Silver Leaf Medal of the European Plant Protection Organization "Plant Europe" (Uppsala, Sweden, 1998).

References 

1938 births
2016 deaths
Recipients of the Order of Princess Olga, 3rd class
20th-century Ukrainian women scientists
Ukrainian botanists
Scientists from Kyiv
21st-century Ukrainian women scientists
Women botanists
Ukrainian women biologists
20th-century botanists
21st-century botanists
Women conservationists